The Ministry of Education, Science, Culture and Sport of Georgia (Old name – Ministry of Education and Science) is a governmental body responsible for education system and children's services in Georgia. Ministry of Education works under the Minister of Education and Science of Georgia. The ministry is located on Uzandze street in Tbilisi in a historical building built in Mauritanic style.

Ministers

Ministers of Georgian Democratic Republic
Giorgi Laskhishvili, 26 May 1918 – 21 March 1919
Noe Ramishvili, 21 March 1919 – 1920
Grigol Lortkipanidze, 1920 – 1921
Mamia Orakhelashvili, 1921 – 1922

Education commissaries of Georgian SSR
 David Kandelaki, 1922 – 1929
 Gaioz Devdariani, 1929 – 1931
 Mamia Orakhelashvili (Second Time), 1931 – 1933
 Ermillo Bedia, 1933 – 1934
 Akaki Tatarashvili, 1934 – 1936
 Malakia Toroshelidze, 1936 – 1937
 Kote Chkuaseli, 1937
 Ermile Burchuladze, 1937 – 1938
 George Kiknadze, 1938 – 1944
 Viktor Kupradze, 1944 – 1953

Ministers of Higher and Secondary Special Education of Georgian SSR
 Giorgi Jibladze, 1953 – 1960
 Tamar Lashkarashvili, 1960 – 1976
 Otar Kinkladze, 1976 – 1986
 Natela Vasadze, 1986 – 1988
 Guram Enukidze, 1988 – 1990

Ministers of Education of Republic of Georgia
 Lia Andguladze, 1990 – 1991
 Elizbar Javelidze, 1991 – 1992
 Gucha Kvaratskhelia, 13 January, 1992 – 20 December, 1992
 Kote Gabashvili, 1992 – 1993
 Tamaz Kvachantiradze, 1993 – 1998
 Aleksandre Kartozia, 6 August, 1998 – 17 February, 2004

Ministers after 2004
Alexander Lomaia, 17 February 2004 – 19 November 2007
Maia Miminoshvili, 22 November 2007 – 31 January 2008
Ghia Nodia, 31 January 2008 – 27 October 2008
Nika Gvaramia, 27 October 2008 – 8 December 2009
Dimitri Shashkin, 8 December 2009 – 4 July 2012
Khatia Dekanoidze, 4 July 2012 – 25 October 2012
Giorgi Margvelashvili, 25 October 2012 – 18 July 2013
Tamar Sanikidze, 18 July 2013 – 3 June 2016
Aleksandre Jejelava, 3 June 2016 – 20 June 2018
Mikheil Chkhenkeli, 20 June 2018 – 14 July 2018
Mikheil Batiashvili, 12 July 2018 – 7 November 2019 (as Minister of Education, Science, Sports and Culture)
Mikheil Chkhenkeli, 13 November 2019 – Present

References

External links 

 Ministry of Education and Science of Georgia
 Ministry of Education and Science of Georgia 

Government of Georgia (country)
Education in Georgia (country)
Georgia
Georgia